Rayka Babol Football Club (Bashgah-e Futbal-e Raika Babol) is an Iranian football based in Babol, Mazandaran.

History
In 2013, Mazani chain store company from Babol, Khooneh Be Khooneh bought Bahman's certificate to take part in 3rd Division Football League. Previously, Khooneh Be Khooneh had successful experiences with their team in wrestling. With Farshad Pious as their manager they got their first promotion in their first season.

After appointing Hamid Derakhshan midway through the season as manager in their first season at second tier of Iranian football, the team went on a disastrous run and missed out on promotion. However at the end of the season, Alireza Marzban the coach of Azadegan League champions Paykan announced he had taken over as manager. 
In 2016–17 season following high hopes with Marzban as the coach, after suffering from some weak results, specially their 3-0 defeat against their rival Baadraan, club and manager decided to take separate ways from about middle of the season. Then Levon Stepanyan and Alireza Emamifar took over and co-managed the team against Pars Jonoubi Jam and Sepidrood as caretakers. After a little while Nader Dastneshan managed the team for the rest of the season and failed to promote to upper division.

In 2017-18, they chose former national team captain and assistant manager Javad Nekounam as their manager. Being under Carlos Queiroz for a few months, Nekounam started his first season as manager with brilliant vision and strong ideas. He got great results with the team in the league and led them to the Hazfi Cup semi-final. Just after losing the first game of his season with Khooneh Be Khooneh, he resigned from his position and soon after losing his second game of the season he left the club. He later signed for the other Mazani club Nassaji and later led them into the Persian Gulf Pro League after 24 years out of it. Later the club replaced Nekounam with Croatian coach Dragan Skočić. Although Skočić got great results with the team and even went on an unbeaten streak for 11 games and also led the team to the Hazfi Cup final, he failed to promote the team in the last week because of goal difference and with Nassaji in the table after Nassaji crushed Rah Ahan 6-0 in Tehran.

Honours

Domestic
Hazfi Cup
Runners-up (1): 2017–18

Season-by-season

The table below shows the achievements of the club in various competitions.

Notes
R buy the right to play in Azadegan League from Bahman Shiraz.

First-team squad 
As of December 17, 2020

Current managerial staff

Managerial history
As of 2 May 2018.

References

Football clubs in Iran
Association football clubs established in 2019
2019 establishments in Iran
Babol